February 3 - Eastern Orthodox liturgical calendar - February 5

All fixed commemorations below are observed on February 17 by Eastern Orthodox Churches on the Old Calendar.

For February 4th, Orthodox Churches on the Old Calendar commemorate the Saints listed on January 22.

Feasts

 Afterfeast of the Meeting of our Lord in the Temple.

Saints

 Martyrs Jadorus and Isidore, who suffered under Decius (3rd century)
 Hieromartyr Phileas, Bishop of Thmuis, and Martyr Philoromus the Magistrate (c. 303)
 Martyr Theoctistus, by the sword.
 Venerable John of Irenopolis, Bishop of Irenopolis, Cilicia and one of the 318 fathers of Nicaea (c. 325)
 Hieromartyr Abramius of Arbela, Bishop of Arbela in Assyria (c. 344–347)
 Venerable Isidore of Pelusium (c. 436–440)
 Saint Evagrius, fellow-ascetic of St. Shio of Mgvime, Georgia (6th century)
 Venerable Nicetas of Pythiae (modern Kouri) (pre-iconoclasm)
 Venerable Iasimos the Wonderworker (Jasim), monk and healer.
 Venerable Nicholas the Confessor, Abbot, of the Studion Monastery (868)

Pre-Schism Western saints

 Martyrs Aquilinus, Geminus, Gelasius, Magnus and Donatus, martyrs in 'Forum Sempronii', which has been interpreted as Fossombrone in central Italy (3rd century)
 Martyr Eutychius, in Rome under Diocletian (4th century)
 Saint Aventinus of Chartres, Bishop of Chartres (c. 520)
 Saint Aventinus of Troyes, an almoner to St Lupus, Bishop of Troyes, then became a hermit at Saint-Aventin (c. 538)
 Saint Vincent of Troyes, Bishop of Troyes (c. 546)
 Hieromartyr Aldate of Gloucester (6th century)
 Saint Modan, Abbot of Stirling and Falkirk (6th century)
 Saint Liephard, a bishop and companion of King Cædwalla of Wessex during the latter's pilgrimage to Rome, martyred near Cambrai in France (690)
 Saint Vulgis, Bishop and Abbot of Lobbes Abbey in Belgium (c. 760)
 Saint Nithard, a monk at Corbie Abbey in Saxony in Germany and a companion of St Ansgar, whom he followed to Sweden as a missionary, martyred there by pagan Swedes (845)
 Saint Rembert, Bishop of Hamburg-Bremen (865)

Post-Schism Orthodox saints

 Right-Believing George of Vladimir, Great Prince of Vladimir (1238)
 Venerable Abraham and Coprius, founders of Pechenga Monastery in Vologda (15th century)
 Venerable Cyril, Abbot and Wonderworker of New Lake Monastery (Novoezersk) in Novgorod (1532)  (see also November 7)
 New Martyr Joseph of Aleppo in Syria (1686)

New martyrs and confessors

 Venerable Martyr Anthony of Supraśl (1516)
 New Martyr Joseph of Aleppo in Syria (1686)
 New Hieromartyr Methodius (Krasnoperov), Bishop of Petropavlovsk (1921)
 New Hieromartyrs (1938):
 Theodosius (Bobkov), Hieromonk of the Chudov Monastery, Moscow
 Nicholas Kandaurov, Archpriest, Moscow
 Boris Nazarov, Archpriest, of Protasievo, Verey
 Alexander Pokrovsky, Archpriest, of Mineyevo, Moscow
 Alexander Sokolov, Archpriest, of Paveltsovo, Moscow
 Peter Sokolov, Archpriest, of Klin, Moscow
 John Tikhomirov, Archpriest, of Petrovskoye, Moscow
 Nicholas Pospelov, priest, of Bylovo, Podolsk
 Virgin-martyr Raphaela Vishnyakova, Schemanun, of Moscow

 Seraphim Vavilov, Archdeacon 
 Alexy Knyazhesky, priest
 Nikolay Golyshev, priest
 Arkady Lobtsov, priest
 Mikhail Rybin, priest
 Alexei Lebedev, priest
 Andrew Bednov, priest
 Dimitri Kedrolivansky, priest
 John Artobolevsky, Archpriest, Moscow
 John Aleshkovsky, priest
 Alexander Minervin, priest
 Alexis Sharov, priest
 Eustace Sokolsky, priest
 Sergius Soloviev, priest
 Virgin-martyrs Anna Efremova, Maria Vinogradova and Ekaterina Dekalina

 Martyrs John Shuvalov, Basil Ivanov, Demetry Ilyinsky, Theodore Palshkov, and Demetry Kazamatsky (1938)

Other commemorations

 Repose of the royal recluse Nun Dosithea of Moscow (1810)

Icon gallery

Notes

References

Sources
 February 4 / 17. Orthodox Calendar (Pravoslavie.ru).
 February 17 / 4. Holy Trinity Russian Orthodox Church (A parish of the Patriarchate of Moscow).
 February 4. OCA - The Lives of the Saints.
 The Autonomous Orthodox Metropolia of Western Europe and the Americas. St. Hilarion Calendar of Saints for the year of our Lord 2004. St. Hilarion Press (Austin, TX). p. 12.
 The Fourth Day of the Month of February. Orthodoxy in China.
 February 4. Latin Saints of the Orthodox Patriarchate of Rome.
 The Roman Martyrology. Transl. by the Archbishop of Baltimore. Last Edition, According to the Copy Printed at Rome in 1914. Revised Edition, with the Imprimatur of His Eminence Cardinal Gibbons. Baltimore: John Murphy Company, 1916. pp. 37–38.
 Rev. Richard Stanton. A Menology of England and Wales, or, Brief Memorials of the Ancient British and English Saints Arranged According to the Calendar, Together with the Martyrs of the 16th and 17th Centuries. London: Burns & Oates, 1892. pp. 51–54.
Greek Sources
 Great Synaxaristes:  4 Φεβρουαρίου. Μεγασ Συναξαριστησ.
  Συναξαριστής. 4 Φεβρουαρίου. Ecclesia.gr. (H Εκκλησια Τησ Ελλαδοσ).
Russian Sources
  17 февраля (4 февраля). Православная Энциклопедия под редакцией Патриарха Московского и всея Руси Кирилла (электронная версия). (Orthodox Encyclopedia - Pravenc.ru).
  4 февраля по старому стилю / 17 февраля по новому стилю. Русская Православная Церковь - Православный церковный календарь на 2018 год.

February in the Eastern Orthodox calendar